Omiodes tristrialis is a moth in the family Crambidae. It was described by Otto Vasilievich Bremer in 1864. It is found in the Russian Far East (Amur), China, Taiwan and Japan.

The wingspan is about 20 mm.

References

Moths described in 1864
tristrialis
Taxa named by Otto Vasilievich Bremer